John Baptiste Berthier (February 24, 1840 – October 16, 1908) was a Catholic missionary and educator. Berthier was born February 24, 1840, in Chatonnay in southern France. He founded a Catholic religious institute, the Institute for Late Vocations in Grave, the Netherlands in 1895 - organized to meet the needs of men who desired to become priests later in their life. The organization received episcopal approval in 1904, and  took the name Missionaries of the Holy Family. Berthier died October 16, 1908. Berthier was the author of 36 ascetical and theological works, largely relating to the diversity of ways to holiness through imitating the holy family.

The group expanded into Germany, Switzerland, Belgium, and Brazil by 1910.  there were Holy Family priests and brothers serving in 22 countries around the world. its members cultivate a special devotion to Our Lady, Reconciler of Sinners, retaining thus a spiritual kinship with the Missionaries of La Salette, of which Berthier was a member.

The cause for beatification for John Berthier has been opened.

Bibliography 
Thoughts of Father Berthier: A Treasure with Old and New Things, by Father Berthier - Congregazione dei Missionari della Sacra Famiglia, Editions du Signe, (c) 2011, www.editionsdusigne.fr.
Les merveilles de la Salette. Téqui, 1898.

References

19th-century French Roman Catholic priests
1840 births
1908 deaths
French expatriates in the Netherlands
Venerated Catholics by Pope Francis